This is a list of events from British radio in 1966.

Events

January
 20 January – Radio Caroline ship  loses its anchor in a storm, drifts and runs aground on the beach at Frinton-on-Sea.

February
No events

March
No events

April
17 April – The first regular stereo radio transmissions begin, from the Wrotham transmitter.

May
3 May – Pirate radio stations Swinging Radio England and Britain Radio commence broadcasting on AM, with a combined potential 100,000 watts, from the same ship (MV Olga Patricia) anchored off the south coast of England in international waters.

June
No events

July
No events

August
No events

September
27 September – Irish radio personality Terry Wogan makes his debut on the BBC, broadcasting on the Light Programme.

October
27 October – Welsh writer and broadcaster Gwyn Thomas makes a notable tribute to the children of Aberfan following the Aberfan disaster of 21 October, broadcast across the UK on the BBC Home Service's Today morning programme.

November
No events

December
No events

Unknown
Britain's first student radio station, the University of Kent's UKC Radio is founded, initially as an audio feed through the radiator system. It airs until 2006.

Station debuts
3 May
Swinging Radio England (1966)
Britain Radio (1966–1967)
4 June – Radio 270 (1966–1967)
Autumn – UKC Radio (1966–Present)

Programme debuts
 March –The Embassy Lark (1966–1968)

Continuing radio programmes

1940s
 Music While You Work (1940–1967)
 Sunday Half Hour (1940–2018)
 Desert Island Discs (1942–Present)
 Family Favourites (1945–1980)
 Down Your Way (1946–1992)
 Have A Go (1946–1967)
 Housewives' Choice (1946–1967)
 Letter from America (1946–2004)
 Woman's Hour (1946–Present)
 Twenty Questions (1947–1976)
 Any Questions? (1948–Present)
 The Dales (1948–1969)
 Billy Cotton Band Show (1949–1968)
 A Book at Bedtime (1949–Present)

1950s
 The Archers (1950–Present)
 Listen with Mother (1950–1982)
 From Our Own Correspondent (1955–Present)
 Pick of the Pops (1955–Present)
 The Clitheroe Kid (1957–1972)
 My Word! (1957–1988)
 Test Match Special (1957–Present)
 The Today Programme (1957–Present)
 The Navy Lark (1959–1977)
 Sing Something Simple (1959–2001)
 Your Hundred Best Tunes (1959–2007)

1960s
 Farming Today (1960–Present)
 Easy Beat (1960–1967)
 In Touch (1961–Present)
 The Men from the Ministry (1962–1977)
 I'm Sorry, I'll Read That Again (1964–1973)
 Petticoat Line (1965–1979)
 Round the Horne (1965–1968)
 The World at One (1965–Present)

Births
19 January – Henry Naylor, comedy writer, director and performer
8 February – Sarah Montague, journalist and broadcast presenter
11 March – Paddy O'Connell, broadcast presenter
1 April – Chris Evans, disc jockey and television presenter
25 August – Tracy Ann Oberman, actress
9 September – Nikki Bedi, née Moolgaoker, broadcast presenter
15 September – Claire Sturgess, disc jockey and voiceover artist
26 October – Judge Jules (Julius O'Riordan), dance music DJ and producer
30 November – Andy Parsons, comedian
31 December – Carlos (Carl Emms), disc jockey
Alan Smith, radio news presenter

Deaths
11 April – A. B. Campbell, naval officer and broadcaster (born 1881)
2 June – Stephen King-Hall, naval officer, politician and broadcaster (born 1893)
21 July – A. G. Street, broadcaster on country matters (born 1892)
2 December – Giles Cooper, broadcast dramatist (born 1918)

See also
 1966 in British music
 1966 in British television
 1966 in the United Kingdom
 List of British films of 1966

References

 
Radio
Years in British radio